The Governor of the Bank of France (French: Gouverneur de la Banque de France) is the most senior officer of the Bank of France. The position is currently held by François Villeroy de Galhau, who took office on 1 November 2015.

Duties and responsibilities 
Assisted by two Deputy Governors and independent with regard to political authorities, the Governor administers the Banque de France in pursuit of its three core missions: monetary strategy, financial stability and services to the economy.

He chairs the General Council, which deliberates on issues concerning the management of activities outside the purview of the Eurosystem.

He also sits on the Governing Council of the European Central Bank, which is responsible for setting Eurosystem monetary policy.

Associated positions 
The duties of the Governor of the Banque de France include fulfilling several mandates laid down in the Monetary and Financial Code, including:

 Member of the Governing Council of the European Central Bank
 Chair of the Prudential Supervision and Resolution Authority
 Member of the High Council for Financial Stability
 Chairman of the Observatory for the Security of Payment Means
 Member of the Board of Directors of the Bank for International Settlements
 Member of the National Financial Education Committee.

Appointment 
Since the constitutional revision of 23 July 2008, the Governor of the Banque de France has been appointed by decree of the President of the Republic following consultation with the Finance Committees of the National Assembly and the Senate, which have the power to veto appointments by a three-fifths majority vote.

List of governors of the Banque de France 
List of governors of the Banque de France, which is a member of the European Central Bank:

References

Economy of France-related lists
Lists of office-holders in France
France